Rafał Wójcik (born 18 September 1972 in Starachowice) is a Polish long-distance runner.

Up to 2004 he specialized in the 3000 metres steeplechase. He finished eighth at the 2002 European Championships and competed without reaching the final at the 1997 and 1999 World Championships as well as the 2000 Summer Olympics.

From 2005 he has concentrated on the marathon race. In this event he finished sixteenth at the 2005 World Championships and twelfth at the 2006 European Championships.

Personal bests
1500 metres - 3:42.84 min (2000)
5000 metres - 7:57.28 min (2004)
3000 metres steeplechase - 8:17.09 min (2000)
5000 metres - 13:49.29 min (1998)
10,000 metres - 29:06.16 min (2005)
Half marathon - 1:03:54 (2007)
Marathon - 2:13:02 (2008)

External links

1972 births
Living people
People from Starachowice
Polish male steeplechase runners
Polish male long-distance runners
Athletes (track and field) at the 2000 Summer Olympics
Olympic athletes of Poland
Sportspeople from Świętokrzyskie Voivodeship